Howard Fletcher Frier (born March 31, 1976) is a retired American-Estonian basketball player.

Howard played college basketball for the Colorado Buffaloes averaging 4.5 points and 3.8 rebounds in his senior year. After graduating he played two seasons in the International Basketball Association League for Rochester Skeeters. After that he shortly played for Wardich Rosaire in Lebanon and Fargo-Moorhead Beez in IBA League.

Frier's European career started in Austria, where he played three seasons for Oberwaltersdorf basketball club. In 2004 Frier signed a deal with Estonian top team BC Kalev/Cramo. He instantly became a lead player and one of the top performers in the team. His excellent performances in the KML finals helped Kalev beat Tartu Ülikool/Rock with the games 4–3 and bring the team's first Estonian League title and season MVP title to Howard. He averaged 13.9 points and 3 rebounds in the play-offs. Frier stayed with Kalev and in 2005–2006 season he helped the team to win a second consecutive Estonian championship averaging 12.9 points and 4.1 rebounds in the play-offs.

Howard then went to Sweden to play for Ockelbo BBK, he also shortly played in Poland and then returned to Estonia. He started the season with BC Kraft Mööbel and his good performances caught Kalev/Cramo's attention. The Kalev fans gave a warm welcome to the former team star. In 2009 January he played one game for Tampereen Pyrintö in Finland and then signed with Górnik Wałbrzych in Poland.

Achievements
 Estonian National Championship: 2004–05, 2005–06
 Runner-up: 2007–08
 Estonian League MVP 2004–05
 Estonian League Finals MVP 2004–05

References

External links
Profile  at basketpedya.com

1976 births
Living people
American expatriate basketball people in Austria
American expatriate basketball people in Estonia
American expatriate basketball people in Finland
American expatriate basketball people in Lebanon
American expatriate basketball people in Poland
American expatriate basketball people in Sweden
Basketball players from Virginia
BC Kalev/Cramo players
Colorado Buffaloes men's basketball players
Korvpalli Meistriliiga players
Point guards
BC Rakvere Tarvas players
Shooting guards
Tampereen Pyrintö players
Sportspeople from Suffolk, Virginia
American men's basketball players